Hapoel Ra'anana W.A.F.C. is an Israeli women's football club from Ra'anana competing in the Israeli Second League and the Israeli Women's Cup.

History
A youth women's football club operated in Ra'anana since 2008, and in 2016 the club opened a women's team and joined Ligat Nashim, playing in second division, Liga Leumit Nashim. The club won the division in its first season and was promoted to the top division.

Titles
Israeli 2nd Division (1)
2016–17

References

External links
 Hapoel Ra'anana  Israeli Football Association 

Sport in Ra'anana
Women's football clubs in Israel
Association football clubs established in 2016
2016 establishments in Israel